This is a list of Penrith Panthers representatives, players from the club selected to play for international or domestic representative teams.

Players chosen from the Windsor Wolves between 2008 and 2013 as the Wolves acted as Penrith's New South Wales Cup team. Players chosen from St Marys Saints are listed only if they played for the Panthers in the same year as their representative selection.

International

Royce Simmons (1986–87)
 Greg Alexander (1989–90)
 John Cartwright (1990–92)
 Mark Geyer (1990–91)
 Brad Fittler (1991–95)
 Graham Mackay (1992)
 Matt Sing (1995)
 Craig Gower (1999-01, 2003–05)
 Ryan Girdler (1999-01)
 Trent Waterhouse (2003–05, 2009) 
 Joel Clinton (2004) 
 Luke Rooney (2004–05) 
 Luke Priddis (2005) 
 Petero Civoniceva (2008–11) 
 Luke Lewis (2009–12) 
 Michael Jennings (2009) 
 Josh Mansour (2014, 2016–17) 
 Matt Moylan (2016) 
 Trent Merrin (2016–17) 
 Reagan Campbell-Gillard (2017) 
 Nathan Cleary (2022)
 Liam Martin (2022)
 Isaah Yeo (2022)

 Australia (SL)
 Craig Gower (1997)
 Ryan Girdler (1997)
 Matt Adamson (1997)

Tinirau Arona (2009) 
 Geoff Daniela (2012) 
 Isaac John (2013) 
 Tupou Sopoaga (2016)

Livai Nalagilagi (1994) 
 Joe Dakuitoga (1995) 
 Wes Naiqama (2013–14) 
 Eto Nabuli (2014) 
 Kevin Naiqama (2014) 
 Reagan Campbell-Gillard (2014) 
 Apisai Koroisau (2015) 
 Viliame Kikau (2016–17, 2019) 
 Waqa Blake (2017) 
 Tyrone Phillips (2018)

Billy Tsikrikas (2019) 
 George Tsikrikas (2019)

Cameron Ciraldo (2013) 
 Mason Cerruto (2017) 
 Anton Iaria (2019) 
 Alexander Myles (2019) 
 John Trimboli (2019)

Jarrod Sammut (2006–07) 
 Cowen Epere (2017)

Gary Freeman (1994–95) 
 Tony Puletua (1998–00, 2002–07) 
 Joe Galuvao (2003–04) 
 Paul Whatuira (2004) 
 Frank Pritchard (2005–09) 
 Sam McKendry (2010–13) 
 Dean Whare (2013–15, 2017) 
 Isaac John (2014) 
 Lewis Brown (2014–15) 
 Dallin Watene-Zelezniak (2016–18) 
 Te Maire Martin (2016) 
 James Fisher-Harris (2016, 2018–19, 2022) 
 Moses Leota (2022)
 Scott Sorensen (2022)

Paul Aiton (2007–08) 
 Keith Peters (2007–09) 
 Jason Chan (2008) 
 James Nightingale (2008) 
 Wellington Albert (2015) 
 Stanton Albert (2015)

Fa'ausu Afoa (1995) 
 Frank Puletua (2000, 2007–08) 
 Brian Leauma (2000) 
 Fred Petersen (2000) 
 Junior Tia-Kilifi (2006) 
 Tony Puletua (2008) 
 Joseph Paulo (2007–10) 
 Masada Iosefa (2010) 
 Mose Masoe (2013) 
 Jarome Luai (2017, 2019, 2022) 
 Christian Crichton (2018) 
 Tyrone May (2018) 
 Brian To'o (2019, 2022) 
 Moses Leota (2019) 
 Charlie Staines (2022)
 Taylan May (2022)
 Izack Tago (2022)
 Spencer Leniu (2022)
 Stephen Crichton (2022)

Lachlan Stein (2017) 
 Peter Wallace (2013)

Michael Jennings (2008) 
 Daniel Foster (2013–15) 
 Sika Manu (2013–15) 
 Ben Murdoch-Masila (2014–15) 
 Sione Katoa (2016–19) 
 Leilani Latu (2017) 
 Soni Luke (2022)

Mark O'Halloran (2007) 
 Junior Paulo (2011) 
 Clint Newton (2013)

State Of Origin

New South Wales
    Brad Izzard (1982, 1991)
    Royce Simmons (1984, 1986–88)
    Greg Alexander (1989–91)
    John Cartwright (1989, 1991–92)
    Mark Geyer (1989, 1991)
    Chris Mortimer (1989)
    Peter Kelly (1989)
    Brad Fittler (1990–95)
    Graham Mackay (1992–94)
    Steve Carter (1992)
    Ryan Girdler (1999-01)
    Craig Gower (2001, 2004–06)
    Matt Adamson (2001)
    Trent Waterhouse (2004, 2009–10)
    Luke Rooney (2004)
    Luke Lewis (2004, 2009–10)
    Michael Jennings (2009–16)
    Michael Gordon (2010)
    Tim Grant (2012)
    Matt Moylan (2016)
    Josh Mansour (2016)
    James Maloney (2018–19)
    Nathan Cleary (2018–22)
    Reagan Campbell-Gillard (2018)
    Tyrone Peachey (2018)
    Isaah Yeo (2020-22)
    Brian To'o (2021-22)
    Jarome Luai (2021-22)
    Liam Martin (2021-22)
    Apisai Koroisau (2021-22)
    Stephen Crichton (2022)

New South Wales (SL)
    Craig Gower (1997)
    Ryan Girdler (1997)
    Greg Alexander (1997)

Queensland
    Darryl Brohman (1983, 1986)
    Alan McIndoe (1989–90)
    Trevor Gillmeister (1994)
    Matt Sing (1995)
    Craig Greenhill (1999-00)
    Scott Sattler (2003)
    Rhys Wesser (2004, 2006)
    Ben Ross (2004–05)
    Petero Civoniceva (2008–11)
    Kurt Capewell (2020-21)

All Stars Game

NRL All Stars
    Michael Jennings (2010, 2011, 2012)
    Tim Grant (2013)
    Matt Moylan (2015)
    Trent Merrin (2016)

Indigenous All Stars
    Tyrone Peachey (2015, 2016)
    Will Smith (2016)
    Jamie Soward (2016)
    Leilani Latu (2016)

Māori All Stars
  Dean Whare (2019)
  James Tamou (2019)
  James Fisher-Harris (2019, 21)
  Malakai Watene-Zelezniak (2020)
  Zane Tetevano (2020)
  Jarome Luai (2021)

City Vs Country Origin

NSW City
    Greg Alexander (1988)
    John Cartwright (1990, 1992)
    Mark Geyer (1991)
    Paul Clarke (1991)
    Brad Fittler (1991)
    Colin van der Voort (1991)
   Paul Smith (1991)
    Robbie Beckett (1995)
    Jody Gall (2001)
    Craig Gower (2003, 2005–07)
    Joel Clinton (2003, 2005–06)
    Shane Rodney (2004)
    Luke Rooney (2004, 2006, 2008)
    Luke Lewis (2004–08)
    Trent Waterhouse (2006, 2009–10)
    Michael Jennings (2009–10)
    Lachlan Coote (2010)
    Tim Grant (2010)
    Matt Moylan (2014–15)
    Waqa Blake (2015)
    Tyrone Peachey (2015–16)
    Reagan Campbell-Gillard (2015–16)
    Bryce Cartwright (2016–17)
    Lelani Latu (2016)
    Josh Mansour (2016)
    James Tamou (2017)
    Nathan Cleary (2017)

NSW Country
    Royce Simmons (1988)
    Chris Mortimer (1989)
    Steve Carter (1991–92, 1995)
    Chris Hicks (2001)
    Luke Priddis (2004, 2006)
    Amos Roberts (2004)
    Preston Campbell (2005)
    Michael Gordon (2011)
    Jamal Idris (2014)
    Adam Docker (2014)
    Isaah Yeo (2016)

Other honours

Prime Minister's XIII
    Luke Priddis (2005)
    Ben Ross (2005)
    Trent Waterhouse (2006, 2009)
    Craig Stapleton (2006)
    Michael Jennings (2008–09)
    Maurice Blair (2008)
    Petero Civoniceva (2009)
    Tim Grant (2011)
    Lachlan Coote (2012)
    Kevin Kingston (2012)
    Matt Moylan (2014, 2016)
    Josh Mansour (2014)
    Jeremy Latimore (2015)
    Reagan Campbell-Gillard (2015, 2018)
    James Segeyaro (2015)
    Tyrone Peachey (2015, 2018)

Indigenous Dreamtime Team
 Rhys Wesser (2008)
 Maurice Blair (2008)

New Zealand Māori
 Sam McKendry (2008, 2010)
 Sandor Earl (2010)

Representative captains

International
  Gary Freeman (1994–95)
  Brad Fittler (1995)
  Craig Gower (2005)
  Sika Manu (2014–15)
  Wes Naiqama (2014)
  Tupou Sopoaga (2016)
  Dallin Watene-Zelezniak (2018)

Representative Coaching Staff

State Of Origin
New South Wales
    Phil Gould (Coach - 1992-94)

City Vs Country Origin
NSW City
    Phil Gould (Coach - 1992-94)

References

Representatives
Rugby league representative players lists
Sydney-sport-related lists